White City is an unincorporated community and census-designated place (CDP) in Jackson County, Oregon, United States. The population was 7,975 at the 2010 census, up from 5,466 at the 2000 census.

History

Geography

Climate
This region experiences warm (but not hot) and dry summers, with no average monthly temperatures above .  According to the Köppen Climate Classification system, White City has a warm-summer Mediterranean climate, abbreviated "Csb" on climate maps.

Demographics

As of the 2010 U.S. census, there were 7,975 people, 2,431 households, and 1,865 families residing in the CDP. There were 3,018 housing units, of which 587, or 19.4%, were vacant. The racial makeup of the CDP was 74.7% White, 1.3% African American, 1.3% Native American, 0.8% Asian, 0.1% Pacific Islander, 17.8% some other race, and 3.9% from two or more races. Hispanic or Latino of any race were 28.8% of the population.

Of the 2,431 households in the CDP, 42.5% had children under the age of 18 living with them, 53.2% were headed by married couples living together, 16.0% had a female householder with no husband present, and 23.3% were non-families. 17.0% of all households were made up of individuals, and 5.1% were someone living alone who was 65 years of age or older. The average household size was 3.08 and the average family size was 3.43.

29.8% of the residents in the CDP were under the age of 18, 9.4% were from ages 18 to 24, 28.5% were from 25 to 44, 23.7% were from 45 to 64, and 8.5% were 65 years of age or older. The median age was 31.6 years. For every 100 females, there were 111.8 males. For every 100 females age 18 and over, there were 115.4 males.

For the period 2012-2016, the estimated median annual income for a household in the CDP was $44,940, and the median income for a family was $48,503. Male full-time workers had a median income of $35,333 versus $27,551 for females. The per capita income for the CDP was $15,368. About 15.2% of families and 19.6% of the population were below the poverty line, including 17.3% of those under age 18 and 17.4% of those age 65 or over.

In 2009 the estimated cost of living index in White City was 90.1, which is less than the U.S. average of 100.

Parks and recreation

The Oregon Department of Fish and Wildlife's Denman Wildlife Area has segments north and south of White City.  The TouVelle State Recreation Site is located along Table Rock Road where it crosses the Rogue River.  Furthermore, The Nature Conservancy's Agate Desert Preserve is on the west side of White City.

Transportation
White City is located at the junction of Oregon Route 62 and Oregon Route 140. White City is also served by RVTD Route 60 connecting to Medford, and by the Southwest POINT bus service, which is an intercity route connecting to a number of Southern Oregon cities.

Freight rail service is provided to the White City Industrial Park by Rogue Valley Terminal Railroad

Facilities
White City hosts the main United States Department of Veterans Affairs hospital serving southern Oregon.

References

 
Census-designated places in Oregon
Unincorporated communities in Jackson County, Oregon
Census-designated places in Jackson County, Oregon
Unincorporated communities in Oregon